The white-winged grosbeak (Mycerobas carnipes) is a species of finch in the family Fringillidae.

It is found in Afghanistan, Bhutan, China, India, Iran, Myanmar, Nepal, Pakistan, Russia, Tajikistan, Turkmenistan, and Uzbekistan. Its natural habitat is boreal forests.

Phylogeny
Eophona genus goes together with Mycerobas genus. Both genera form a single phylogenetic group.

References

white-winged grosbeak
Birds of Central Asia
Birds of Afghanistan
Birds of Pakistan
Birds of Western China
Birds of Central China
white-winged grosbeak
Taxonomy articles created by Polbot